Gangapur Dam, is an earthfill dam on Godavari river near Nashik in the state of Maharashtra in India.

Specifications

Due to silt deposition in the reservoir area, the storage capacity of the dam has gradually reduced. The right side canal running towards Nashik is also closed due to the high civilization in the area. For these two reasons, an upstream dam, Kashypi Dam, is constructed which opened in 2000

Purpose
 Irrigation
one of the earthen dam having emergency spillway

See also
 Dams in Maharashtra
 List of reservoirs and dams in India

References

Dams in Nashik district
Dams completed in 1965
Dams on the Godavari River
1965 establishments in Maharashtra